The Silos is a census-designated place (CDP) in Broadwater County, Montana, United States. The population was 506 at the 2010 census.

Geography
The Silos is located along the west shore of Canyon Ferry Lake, a reservoir on the Missouri River.

Demographics

References

Census-designated places in Broadwater County, Montana
Census-designated places in Montana